Destination Fear is an American paranormal reality television series that aired on Travel Channel from October 26, 2019 to January 13, 2023.

Premise
Destination Fear is a paranormal documentary featuring Dakota Laden and his team of paranormal enthusiasts, including his sister, Chelsea Laden, and friends Tanner Wiseman and Alex Schroeder. The team takes to the road in an RV, visiting a number of reportedly haunted and paranormal hotspots across the United States, testing the limits of human fear.

Cast
 Dakota Laden (2019–23)
 Chelsea Laden (2019–23)
 Tanner Wiseman (2019–23)
 Alex Schroeder (2021–23)

Production
On August 20, 2019, the series was officially announced and premiered on October 26, 2019. In March 2020, the series was renewed for a second season, which premiered on April 29, 2020. On June 29, 2021, the series was renewed for a third season, which premiered on July 24, 2021. On May 18, 2022, the series was renewed for a fourth season, which premiered on November 25, 2022. In March 2023, Dakota Laden announced that the series had been cancelled, and launched a Kickstarter for a follow-up series titled Project Fear.

Episodes

Series overview

Season 1 (2019)

Season 2 (2020)

Season 3 (2021)

Season 4 (2022–23)

See also
Ghost hunting
Paranormal television
Haunted locations in the United States
Ghost Adventures

References

External links

2010s American reality television series
2019 American television series debuts
2020s American reality television series
2023 American television series endings
Paranormal reality television series
Travel Channel original programming